Almagrundet is a Swedish lighthouse station located southeast of Sandhamn outside the Stockholm archipelago and consists of a number of basic heels at depths between 3 and 14 meters below the sea. The shoal was named after the Norwegian brig Alma got aground in heavy storm in 1866 in a place regarded as safe sea.

History
Lightship no. 2B Sydostbrottet was placed in the area as a warning in 1896. In 1912, no. 6 Svenska Björn came as replacement. Both lightships was painted with Almagrundet in white letters on the sides. In 1964 a modern remote controlled concrete caisson lighthouse replaced the ships and it stands to this day. It was fitted with 72 powerful sealbeam lights, electric cable (connected to the Revengegrundet light), diesel generators, fog horns, helipad, racon, and floodlighting. There was also a kitchenette and two sleeping berths. The lighthouse was constructed in the area of Jävre-Sandholmen, near Piteå and then transported by ship to the location.

In 2008 the electric cable failed and the Swedish Maritime Administration replaced the equipment with a LED 350 powered with sun panels placed on top of the helipad.

Gallery

See also

 List of lighthouses and lightvessels in Sweden

References

External links
 Sjofartsverket 
 The Swedish Lighthouse Society

Lighthouses completed in 1964
Lightships
Lighthouses in Sweden